Lawksawk, also known as Yatsauk (also spelt Yatsawk), is a town in Shan State, Myanmar. It is the capital town and administrative center of Lawksawk Township. It was the historical capital of Lawksawk State. The town is near Bahtoo Station, a major military base.

Transport
Since 1998, Lawksawk has been served by a branch of the Myanmar Railways network that runs from Aungban.

References

Township capitals of Myanmar
Populated places in Shan State